Barreyre Lake is a lake in Alberta, Canada.

Barreyre Lake has the name of Alphonse Barreyre, a pioneer citizen.

See also
List of lakes of Alberta

References

Lakes of Alberta